Arimoto (written 有本) is a Japanese surname. Notable people with the surname include:

, Japanese artistic gymnast
, Japanese voice actor
, Japanese actress and model

Japanese-language surnames